Meautys is a surname. Notable people with the surname include:

Jane Meautys
Thomas Meautys (1592–1649), English civil servant and politician